Fistball European Championships are a competition which has been organized by the International Fistball Association (IFA) since 1965 for men and since 1993 for women.

European Championships - Men

European Championships - Women

External links
International Fistball Association

European Championship
European championships
Recurring sporting events established in 1965